Upendra Lal Chakma ( – 18 July 2005) was a Bangladeshi  politician from Khagrachhari belonging to Jatiya Samajtantrik Dal-JSD. He was a member of the Jatiya Sangsad. He was an adviser to the President of Bangladesh too.

Biography
Chakma was elected as a member of the Jatiya Sangsad from Chittagong Hill Tracts-1 in 1979 as a Jatiya Samajtantrik Dal-JSD candidate. He also served as an adviser to the President of Bangladesh.

Chakma died of cardiac arrest  at Khagrachhari Sadar Hospital on 18 July 2005 at the age of 80.

References

1920s births
2005 deaths
People from Khagrachhari District
2nd Jatiya Sangsad members
Jatiya Samajtantrik Dal politicians